Sana Jamali is a Pakistani politician who has been a Member of the Senate of Pakistan, since March 2018.

Political career
Jamali ran for the seat of the Senate of Pakistan as an independent candidate on a reserved seat for women from Balochistan in 2015 Pakistani Senate election, but was unsuccessful.

Jamali was elected to the Senate as an independent candidate on reserved seat for women from Balochistan in 2018 Pakistani Senate election. She took oath as Senator on 12 March 2018.

References

Living people
Members of the Senate of Pakistan
Year of birth missing (living people)